Trinidad Navarro is an American politician who is the Delaware Insurance Commissioner and previously served as New Castle County Sheriff. He is a Democrat.

Education and career 
Navarro received his associate's degree from Delaware Technical Community College. He later earned a BA from Wilmington University and served as a police officer for New Castle County for over 20 years. In 2010, he was elected New Castle County Sheriff.

State Insurance Commissioner 
In 2016, Navarro defeated incumbent Democrat Karen Weldin Stewart in the primary election for state insurance commissioner, earning 55 percent of the vote. He went on to win the general election with 60 percent of the vote against Republican Jeffrey Cragg. In 2020, he was reelected to a second consecutive term in office.

Navarro is a rumored candidate in the 2024 Delaware gubernatorial election.

Harassment allegations 
In October 2019, a federal lawsuit filed against Navarro by Delaware Department of Insurance employee Fleur McKendell alleged that she had been a victim of workplace sexual and racial discrimination. Included in the suit are claims that Navarro inappropriately touched McKendell's cornrows and made comments about her height and weight. A second lawsuit alleging harassment was filed against Navarro by an employee in January 2020.

References

External links 
Official page for Delaware Insurance Commissioner

21st-century American politicians
Delaware Democrats
Living people
State insurance commissioners of the United States
Year of birth missing (living people)

Wilmington University alumni